Type 66 may refer to:

 Type 66 Howitzer, a Chinese-made version of the Soviet/Russian-made D-20.
 Type 66 helmet, a Japanese-made combat helmet based on the American M1 helmet.
 Peugeot Type 66, a French-made car made in 1904.